Nias Hefti (born 18 December 1999) is a Swiss football player who plays for Thun as a left-back.

Professional career
A youth product of St. Gallen, Hefti began his senior career on loan with FC Wil in the Swiss Challenge League, before transferring to FC Thun in 2019. Hefti made his professional debut with Thun in a 2-2 Swiss Super League tie with Neuchâtel Xamax on 20 July 2019.

On 14 January 2022, Hefti joined Lausanne-Ouchy on loan until the end of the season.

Personal life
Hefti is the brother of the footballer Silvan Hefti.

References

External links
 
  SFL Profile
 SFV U18 Profile
 SFV U19 Profile
 SFV U20 Profile
 SFV U21 Profile

1999 births
Living people
People from Rorschach, Switzerland
Sportspeople from the canton of St. Gallen
Swiss men's footballers
Switzerland youth international footballers
Association football fullbacks
Swiss Super League players
Swiss Challenge League players
FC Thun players
FC Wil players
FC St. Gallen players
FC Stade Lausanne Ouchy players